State Route 14 (SR 14) is a  state highway that travels southwest-to-northeast through portions of Troup, Coweta, and Fulton counties in the west-central and north-central parts of the U.S. state of Georgia. The highway connects the Alabama state line in West Point to Downtown Atlanta, via LaGrange, Fairburn, College Park, and East Point. Except for the northernmost segment, it is entirely concurrent with U.S. Route 29 (US 29).

Route description

SR 14 starts at its southern terminus just west of the Chattahoochee River in West Point in Troup County, and travels northeast through LaGrange, paralleling I-85 to the west, and is concurrent with US 29 for almost its entire length, with the exception of a brief distance at its northern terminus. US 29/SR 14 turns slightly north after leaving LaGrange and travels through Hogansville, then turns northeast again, traveling through Grantville, before crossing I-85 and traveling parallel to the interstate on its east side through portions of Coweta County.

The route then travels into Moreland, where it turns slightly northwest, crosses I-85 once more, and heads into Newnan. Turning northeast once more, the route crosses into Fulton County and heads through Palmetto, Fairburn, and Union City, before crossing I-285 west of Hartsfield–Jackson Atlanta International Airport. SR 14 then continues through East Point, crosses I-20, and arrives at its northern terminus at SR 154 and Ted Turner Drive NW in downtown Atlanta.

There following portions of SR 14 are part of the National Highway System, a system of routes determined to be the most important for the nation's economy, mobility, and defense:
 The concurrency with US 27/SR 1 in LaGrange
 From the I-85 interchange south of East Newnan to the intersection with SR 34 Byp. in Newnan
 From SR 74 in Fairburn to the US 29 Alt./SR 14 Alt. in Red Oak

History

SR 14 was established at least as early as 1919 on its current path, from West Point to Atlanta. Between September 1921 and October 1926, US 29 was designated on SR 14's entire length. Three segments of the highway had a completed hard surface: a portion in the east-northeast part of West Point, from south-southwest of LaGrange to just southwest of the Troup–Meriwether–Coweta county tripoint, and from Moreland to Atlanta. By October 1929, the entire highway had a completed hard surface.

Major intersections

Special routes

LaGrange alternate route

State Route 14 Alternate (SR 14 Alt.) was an alternate route of SR 14 that existed entirely within the city limits of LaGrange. Between June 1963 and the beginning of 1966, it was established from US 29/SR 14/SR 109 (Broad Street) east past SR 219 to US 27/SR 1/SR 219 (Hamilton Road; this intersection also served as the western terminus of SR 720) and north on them to US 29/SR 14/SR 219 (Broad Street; this intersection also served as the southern terminus of US 29 Bus./SR 14 Conn. Between the beginning of 1974 and the beginning of 1977, the path of US 29/SR 14/SR 109 in the western part of the city was shifted southward, replacing the path of SR 14 Alt.

LaGrange connector route (1965–1976)

State Route 14 Connector (SR 14 Conn.) was a connector route of SR 14 that existed entirely within the city limits of LaGrange. Between June 1963 and the beginning of 1966, it was established, concurrent with US 29 Bus., starting at an intersection with US 27/SR 1/SR 14 Alt./SR 219 (Hamilton Road/Franklin Road) and US 29/SR 14/SR 109 (Broad Street/Franklin Road). US 29 Bus./SR 14 Conn. traveled east-northeast on Greenville Street, concurrent with SR 109. Then, they split off of SR 109 and curved to the north-northeast to a second intersection with US 29/SR 14 (Commerce Avenue/Hogansville Road). Between the beginning of 1974 and the beginning of 1977, both US 29 Bus. and SR 14 Conn. were decommissioned.

LaGrange connector route

State Route 14 Connector (SR 14 Conn.) is a  connector route of SR 14 that exists entirely within the city limits of LaGrange. It is known as Broad Street from its western terminus to West LaFayette Square/Church Street. It is known as North LaFayette Square from there to Main Street. It is known as Greenville Street from that point to its eastern terminus. The western end of the highway serves as the northern and western edge of LaGrange College. Between Waverly Way and Gordon Street, it is also the centerpiece of the Broad Street Historic District, and has a concurrency with SR 219 from Greenwood Street to Morgan Street (US 27/US 29/SR 1/SR 14).

The roadway that would eventually become SR 14 Conn. was established at least as early as 1919 as part of US 29/SR 14. Between September 1921 and October 1926, this segment had a "completed hard surface". In 1937, SR 109 was placed on a concurrency with US 29/SR 14. In 1994, US 29/SR 14/SR 109 was shifted southward, onto Vernon Street. The former path was redesignated as SR 14 Conn.

LaGrange spur route

State Route 14 Spur (SR 14 Spur) is a  spur route of SR 14 in the southeastern part of LaGrange, in Troup County. It connects SR 219 in the southern part of the city with US 29/SR 14 northeast of the city.

It begins at an intersection with SR 219 (Whitesville Road). It curves to a northeasterly direction and intersects US 27/SR 1 (Hamilton Road). Then, it reaches SR 109 (Lafayette Parkway) just over  before meeting its northern terminus, an intersection with US 29/SR 14 (Hogansville Road).

SR 14 Spur is not part of the National Highway System, a system of roadways important to the nation's economy, defense, and mobility.

In 1971, SR 14 Spur was established on its current path.

Palmetto–Red Oak alternate route

State Route 14 Alternate (SR 14 Alt.) is a  alternate route of SR 14 that exists entirely within the southern and southeastern parts of Fulton County. It connects Palmetto with Red Oak, located southwest of Atlanta. It is concurrent with US 29 Alt. for its entire length.

It begins at an intersection with US 29/SR 14 (Main Street) in Palmetto. This intersection marks the northern end of US 29/SR 14's concurrency with SR 154, with which US 29 Alt./SR 14 Alt. begins concurrent. The three highways travel north on a nearly due-north direction, until they reach SR 70 (South Fulton Parkway). There, the alternate routes turn to the right, toward Atlanta. The concurrency heads northeast, passing Cedar Grove Lake, and intersects SR 92 (Campbellton–Fairburn Road). They pass South Wind Golf Course and curve to a nearly due-east direction. In Red Oak, they have an interchange with US 29/SR 14 (Roosevelt Highway). Here, both US 29 Alternate/SR 14 Alternate meet their northern terminus, and the roadway continues as SR 14 Conn.

All of SR 14 Alt., from the eastern end of the SR 154 concurrency to its eastern terminus, is included as part of the National Highway System, a system of routes determined to be the most important for the nation's economy, mobility, and defense.

The roadway that would eventually become SR 14 Alt. was proposed in 1992 from SR 154 north-northwest of Palmetto to SR 14 Spur west of Red Oak. The next year, this road was completed. It wasn't until 2007 that US 29 Alt./SR 14 Alt. was designated on its entire current path.

Red Oak spur route

State Route 14 Spur (SR 14 Spur) was a spur route of SR 14 that existed in Red Oak. Between June 1960 and June 1963, it was established from US 29/SR 14 southwest of Red Oak north-northeast and east-southeast to another intersection with US 29/SR 14. Then, it headed in an easterly direction to Interstate 85 (I-85) and north-northwest to US 29/SR 14 east of Red Oak. In 2007, it was redesignated as SR 14 Connector.

Red Oak–College Park connector route

State Route 14 Connector (SR 14 Conn.) is a  connector route of SR 14 in southern Fulton County. Its western terminus is at an interchange with US 29/SR 14 (Roosevelt Highway) in Red Oak, where the roadway continues as US 29 Alt./SR 14 Alt. (South Fulton Parkway), it becomes a state maintained freeway. A short distance later, it enters College Park. At the southwest interchange of I-85 and I-285, it becomes their collector/distributor roads, which continue east through the SR 279 interchange to end at the northeast split of I-85/285.

All of SR 14 Spur is included as part of the National Highway System, a system of roadways important to the nation's economy, defense, and mobility.

The roadway that would eventually become SR 14 Conn. was established between June 1960 and June 1963, as SR 14 Spur from US 29/SR 14 southwest of Red Oak north-northeast and east-southeast to another intersection with US 29/SR 14. It then traveled easterly to I-85 and then north-northwest to US 29/SR 14 east of Red Oak. In 1993, the western terminus was truncated to the middle junction with US 29/SR 14. In 2007, it was redesignated as SR 14 Conn.

See also
 
 
 Transportation in Atlanta

References

External links

 Georgia Roads (Routes 1 - 20)

014
Transportation in Troup County, Georgia
Transportation in Coweta County, Georgia
Transportation in Fulton County, Georgia
Roads in Atlanta
College Park, Georgia